The meridian 111° west of Greenwich is a line of longitude that extends from the North Pole across the Arctic Ocean, North America, the Pacific Ocean, the Southern Ocean, and Antarctica to the South Pole.

The 111th meridian west forms a great circle with the 69th meridian east.

In the United States, the Western border of Wyoming with Montana, Idaho, and Utah lies on the meridian 34° west of Washington, which is a couple of miles west of the meridian 111° west of Greenwich.

From Pole to Pole
Starting at the North Pole and heading south to the South Pole, the 111th meridian west passes through:

{| class="wikitable plainrowheaders"
! scope="col" width="130" | Co-ordinates
! scope="col" | Country, territory or sea
! scope="col" | Notes
|-
| style="background:#b0e0e6;" | 
! scope="row" style="background:#b0e0e6;" | Arctic Ocean
| style="background:#b0e0e6;" |
|-
| 
! scope="row" | 
| Northwest Territories — Borden Island
|-
| style="background:#b0e0e6;" | 
! scope="row" style="background:#b0e0e6;" | Wilkins Strait
| style="background:#b0e0e6;" |
|-
| 
! scope="row" | 
| Northwest Territories — Mackenzie King Island
|-
| style="background:#b0e0e6;" | 
! scope="row" style="background:#b0e0e6;" | Unnamed waterbody
| style="background:#b0e0e6;" |
|-
| 
! scope="row" | 
| Northwest Territories — Melville Island
|-
| style="background:#b0e0e6;" | 
! scope="row" style="background:#b0e0e6;" | Parry Channel
| style="background:#b0e0e6;" | Viscount Melville Sound
|-valign="top"
| 
! scope="row" | 
|-
| style="background:#b0e0e6;" | 
! scope="row" style="background:#b0e0e6;" | Coronation Gulf
| style="background:#b0e0e6;" |
|-valign="top"
| 
! scope="row" | 
|-valign="top"
| 
! scope="row" | 
|-
| 
! scope="row" | 
| Sonora — passing just west of Hermosillo at 
|-
| style="background:#b0e0e6;" | 
! scope="row" style="background:#b0e0e6;" | Gulf of California
| style="background:#b0e0e6;" | 
|-
| 
! scope="row" | 
| Baja California Sur
|-
| style="background:#b0e0e6;" | 
! scope="row" style="background:#b0e0e6;" | Pacific Ocean
| style="background:#b0e0e6;" |
|-
| 
! scope="row" | 
| Socorro Island in the Revillagigedo Islands, Colima
|-
| style="background:#b0e0e6;" | 
! scope="row" style="background:#b0e0e6;" | Pacific Ocean
| style="background:#b0e0e6;" |
|-
| style="background:#b0e0e6;" | 
! scope="row" style="background:#b0e0e6;" | Southern Ocean
| style="background:#b0e0e6;" |
|-
| 
! scope="row" | Antarctica
| Unclaimed territory
|-
|}

See also
110th meridian west
112th meridian west

w111 meridian west